Biocommunication may refer to:
 Biocommunication, the field of medical art and illustration, and other allied communication modalities; see Medical illustrator
 Biocommunication (science), more specific types of communication within (intraspecific) or between (interspecific) species of plants, animals, fungi and microorganisms
 Biocommunication (paranormal), theories of paranormal communication with plants
 The Journal of Biocommunication, a scholarly journal which provides information to the biocommunication community